Muhammad Shah Mir ( محمد شاہ میر) also simply known as Muhammad Shah (Kashmiri محمد شاہ) was the fifteenth-century Sultan of Kashmir from the Shah Mir dynasty.

Life 
Muhammad Shah was the member of Shah-Mir dynasty, the powerful dynasty of Kashmir. He came to power in 1484 and he succeeded Hasan Shah. He had five separate reigns from 1484 to 1537.''

He was succeeded by Fath Shah three times. He was succeeded by Ibrahim Shah after his fourth reign ended. He was succeeded by Sultan Shams-ud-Din after his death.

References

Rulers of Kashmir
Dethroned monarchs
15th-century deaths
15th-century Muslims